The 1970 Arizona Wildcats baseball team represented the University of Arizona in the 1970 NCAA University Division baseball season. The Wildcats played their home games at UA Field. The team was coached by Frank Sancet in his 21st year at Arizona.

The Wildcats won the District VI Playoff to advanced to the College World Series, where they were defeated by the Iowa State Cyclones.

Roster

Schedule 

! style="" | Regular Season
|- valign="top" 

|- align="center" bgcolor="#ccffcc"
| 1 || February 27 ||  || Wildcat Field • Tucson, Arizona || 5–1 || 1–0 || –
|- align="center" bgcolor="#ccffcc"
| 2 || February 28 || Cal Poly Pomona || Wildcat Field • Tucson, Arizona || 5–4 || 2–0 || –
|- align="center" bgcolor="#ccffcc"
| 3 || February 28 || Cal Poly Pomona || Wildcat Field • Tucson, Arizona || 4–2 || 3–0 || –
|-

|- align="center" bgcolor="#ffcccc"
| 4 || March 2 ||  || Wildcat Field • Tucson, Arizona || 5–8 || 3–1 || –
|- align="center" bgcolor="#ccffcc"
| 5 || March 3 || San Diego State || Wildcat Field • Tucson, Arizona || 3–2 || 4–1 || –
|- align="center" bgcolor="#ccffcc"
| 6 || March 9 ||  || Wildcat Field • Tucson, Arizona || 5–4 || 5–1 || –
|- align="center" bgcolor="#ffcccc"
| 7 || March 10 || Cal State Northridge || Wildcat Field • Tucson, Arizona || 1–2 || 5–2 || –
|- align="center" bgcolor="#ffcccc"
| 8 || March 11 ||  || Wildcat Field • Tucson, Arizona || 3–4 || 5–3 || –
|- align="center" bgcolor="#ccffcc"
| 9 || March 12 || TCU || Wildcat Field • Tucson, Arizona || 7–6 || 6–3 || –
|- align="center" bgcolor="#ccffcc"
| 10 || March 13 || TCU || Wildcat Field • Tucson, Arizona  || 9–6 || 7–3 || –
|- align="center" bgcolor="#ccffcc"
| 11 || March 14 || TCU || Wildcat Field • Tucson, Arizona  || 5–2 || 8–3 || –
|- align="center" bgcolor="#ccffcc"
| 12 || March 14 || TCU || Wildcat Field • Tucson, Arizona  || 4–3 || 9–3 || –
|- align="center" bgcolor="#ccffcc"
| 13 || March 16 ||  || Wildcat Field • Tucson, Arizona || 25–6 || 10–3 || –
|- align="center" bgcolor="#ccffcc"
| 14 || March 17 || Weber State || Wildcat Field • Tucson, Arizona || 10–7 || 11–3 || –
|- align="center" bgcolor="#ffcccc"
| 15 || March 18 || Weber State || Wildcat Field • Tucson, Arizona || 1–4 || 11–4 || –
|- align="center" bgcolor="#ccffcc"
| 16 || March 18 || Weber State || Wildcat Field • Tucson, Arizona || 25–3 || 12–4 || –
|- align="center" bgcolor="#ccffcc"
| 17 || March 20 ||  || Wildcat Field • Tucson, Arizona || 6–5 || 13–4 || –
|- align="center" bgcolor="#ccffcc"
| 18 || March 21 || Michigan || Wildcat Field • Tucson, Arizona || 5–1 || 14–4 || –
|- align="center" bgcolor="#ccffcc"
| 19 || March 21 || Michigan || Wildcat Field • Tucson, Arizona || 8–7 || 15–4 || –
|- align="center" bgcolor="#ccffcc"
| 20 || March 23 || Michigan || Wildcat Field • Tucson, Arizona || 10–2 || 16–4 || –
|- align="center" bgcolor="#ffcccc"
| 21 || March 23 || Michigan || Wildcat Field • Tucson, Arizona || 4–12 || 16–5 || –
|- align="center" bgcolor="#ccffcc"
| 22 || March 24 || Michigan || Wildcat Field • Tucson, Arizona || 16–7 || 17–5 || –
|- align="center" bgcolor="#ffcccc"
| 23 || March 25 || Michigan || Wildcat Field • Tucson, Arizona || 5–9 || 17–6 || –
|- align="center" bgcolor="#ccffcc"
| 24 || March 26 || Michigan || Wildcat Field • Tucson, Arizona || 11–5 || 18–6 || –
|- align="center" bgcolor="#ccffcc"
| 25 || March 28 ||  || Wildcat Field • Tucson, Arizona || 20–7 || 19–6 || –
|- align="center" bgcolor="#ffcccc"
| 26 || March 28 || Iowa || Wildcat Field • Tucson, Arizona || 4–8 || 19–7 || –
|- align="center" bgcolor="#ccffcc"
| 27 || March 30 || Iowa || Wildcat Field • Tucson, Arizona || 11–5 || 20–7 || –
|- align="center" bgcolor="#ccffcc"
| 28 || March 31 ||  || Wildcat Field • Tucson, Arizona || 11–1 || 21–7 || –
|-

|- align="center" bgcolor="#ccffcc"
| 29 || April 1 || Iowa || Wildcat Field • Tucson, Arizona || 5–2 || 22–7 || –
|- align="center" bgcolor="#ccffcc"
| 30 || April 2 || Iowa || Wildcat Field • Tucson, Arizona || 6–2 || 23–7 || –
|- align="center" bgcolor="#ccffcc"
| 31 || April 3 || Iowa || Wildcat Field • Tucson, Arizona || 7–6 || 24–7 || –
|- align="center" bgcolor="#ccffcc"
| 32 || April 4 || Iowa || Wildcat Field • Tucson, Arizona || 5–1 || 25–7 || –
|- align="center" bgcolor="#ccffcc"
| 33 || April 4 || Iowa || Wildcat Field • Tucson, Arizona || 15–4 || 26–7 || –
|- align="center" bgcolor="#ccffcc"
| 34 || April 10 || at  || Unknown • El Paso, Texas || 5–3 || 27–7 || 1–0
|- align="center" bgcolor="#ccffcc"
| 35 || April 11 || at UTEP || UA Field • Tucson, Arizona || 6–5 || 28–7 || 2–0
|- align="center" bgcolor="#ffcccc"
| 36 || April 11 || at UTEP || UA Field • Tucson, Arizona || 7–8 || 28–8 || 2–1
|- align="center" bgcolor="#ccffcc"
| 37 || April 14 ||  || Wildcat Field • Tucson, Arizona || 9–8 || 29–8 || 2–1
|- align="center" bgcolor="#ffcccc"
| 38 || April 17 ||  || Wildcat Field • Tucson, Arizona || 0–1 || 29–9 || 2–2
|- align="center" bgcolor="#ffcccc"
| 39 || April 18 || New Mexico || Wildcat Field • Tucson, Arizona || 3–8 || 29–10 || 2–3
|- align="center" bgcolor="#ffcccc"
| 40 || April 18 || New Mexico || Wildcat Field • Tucson, Arizona || 2–3 || 29–11 || 2–4
|- align="center" bgcolor="#ccffcc"
| 41 || April 24 || UTEP || Wildcat Field • Tucson, Arizona || 12–5 || 30–11 || 3–4
|- align="center" bgcolor="#ccffcc"
| 42 || April 25 || UTEP || Wildcat Field • Tucson, Arizona || 6–0 || 31–11 || 4–4
|- align="center" bgcolor="#ccffcc"
| 43 || April 25 || UTEP || Wildcat Field • Tucson, Arizona || 5–2 || 32–11 || 5–4
|- align="center" bgcolor="#ccffcc"
| 44 || April 28 ||  || Wildcat Field • Tucson, Arizona || 7–6 || 33–11 || 5–4
|-

|- align="center" bgcolor="#ccffcc"
| 45 || May 1 || at  || Phoenix Municipal Stadium • Phoenix, Arizona || 3–2 || 34–11 || 6–4
|- align="center" bgcolor="#ccffcc"
| 46 || May 2 || at Arizona State || Phoenix Municipal Stadium • Phoenix, Arizona || 6–4 || 35–11 || 7–4
|- align="center" bgcolor="#ffcccc"
| 47 || May 2 || at Arizona State || Phoenix Municipal Stadium • Phoenix, Arizona || 12–13 || 35–12 || 7–5
|- align="center" bgcolor="#ccffcc"
| 48 || May 5 || Grand Canyon || Wildcat Field • Tucson, Arizona || 8–7 || 36–12 || 7–5
|- align="center" bgcolor="#ffcccc"
| 49 || May 8 || at New Mexico || Lobo Field • Albuquerque, New Mexico || 6–12 || 36–13 || 7–6
|- align="center" bgcolor="#ffcccc"
| 50 || May 9 || at New Mexico || Lobo Field • Albuquerque, New Mexico || 6–8 || 36–14 || 7–7
|- align="center" bgcolor="#ccffcc"
| 51 || May 9 || at New Mexico || Lobo Field • Albuquerque, New Mexico || 6–3 || 37–14 || 8–7
|- align="center" bgcolor="#ccffcc"
| 52 || May 15 || Arizona State || Wildcat Field • Tucson, Arizona || 7–3 || 38–14 || 9–7
|- align="center" bgcolor="#ccffcc"
| 53 || May 16 || Arizona State || Wildcat Field • Tucson, Arizona || 4–0 || 39–14 || 10–7
|- align="center" bgcolor="#ccffcc"
| 54 || May 16 || Arizona State || Wildcat Field • Tucson, Arizona || 9–3 || 40–14 || 11–7
|-

|-
|-
! style="" | Postseason
|- valign="top"

|- align="center" bgcolor="#ccffcc"
| 55 || May 22 || at  || New Cougar Field • Provo, Utah || 10–5 || 41–14 || 11–7
|- align="center" bgcolor="#ffcccc"
| 56 || May 23 || at BYU || New Cougar Field • Provo, Utah || 8–18 || 41–15 || 11–7
|- align="center" bgcolor="#ccffcc"
| 57 || May 23 || at BYU || New Cougar Field • Provo, Utah || 10–8 || 42–15 || 11–7
|-

|- align="center" bgcolor="#ccffcc"
| 58 || May 28 ||  || Wildcats Field • Tucson, Arizona || 4–2 || 43–15 || 11–7
|- align="center" bgcolor="#ffcccc"
| 59 || May 29 || Denver || Wildcat Field • Tucson, Arizona || 7–9 || 43–16 || 11–7
|- align="center" bgcolor="#ccffcc"
| 60 || May 30 || Denver || Wildcat Field • Tucson, Arizona || 9–8 || 44–16 || 11–7
|-

|- align="center" bgcolor="#ffcccc"
| 61 || June 13 || vs Florida State || Johnny Rosenblatt Stadium • Omaha, Nebraska || 0–4 || 44–17 || 11–7
|- align="center" bgcolor="#ffcccc"
| 62 || June 14 || vs Iowa State || Johnny Rosenblatt Stadium • Omaha, Nebraska || 1–7 || 44–18 || 11–7
|-

Awards and honors 
Leon Hooten
 All-WAC South Division

Steve Mikulic
 All-WAC South Division
 First Team All-American American Baseball Coaches Association

Rod O'Brien
 All-WAC South Division

Dave Prest
 All-WAC South Division

J. Ray Rokey
 All-WAC South Division
 Third Team All-American American Baseball Coaches Association

References 

Arizona Wildcats baseball seasons
Arizona Wildcats baseball
College World Series seasons
Arizona
Western Athletic Conference baseball champion seasons